Franco Leccese (24 April 1925 – 23 June 1992) was an Italian sprinter.

Biography
He won two medals at the International athletics competitions, he has 13 caps in national team from 1949 to 1954.

Achievements

National titles
Franco Leccese has won two times the individual national championship.
1 win in 100 metres (1951)
1 win in 200 metres (1950)

See also
 Italy national relay team

References

External links
 

1925 births
1992 deaths
Italian male sprinters
Olympic athletes of Italy
Athletes (track and field) at the 1952 Summer Olympics
European Athletics Championships medalists
Mediterranean Games gold medalists for Italy
Athletes (track and field) at the 1951 Mediterranean Games
Mediterranean Games medalists in athletics
Italian Athletics Championships winners
People from Condove
Sportspeople from the Metropolitan City of Turin